Taabo is a town in southeastern Ivory Coast. It is a sub-prefecture of and the seat of Taabo Department in Agnéby-Tiassa Region, Lagunes District. Taabo is also a commune.

In 2021, the population of the sub-prefecture of Taabo was 57,189.

Villages
The 14 villages of the sub-prefecture of Taabo and their population in 2014 are:

References

Sub-prefectures of Agnéby-Tiassa
Communes of Agnéby-Tiassa